The 2008 Troy Trojans football team represented Troy University in the 2008 NCAA Division I FBS football season. The Trojans played their home games at Movie Gallery Stadium in Troy, Alabama and competed in the Sun Belt Conference. The Trojans successfully defended their Sun Belt Championship, winning their third title in a row. Troy was coming off an 8–4 record in 2007.

Schedule

Rankings

Personnel

Depth chart

Coaching staff
 Larry Blakeney – Head Coach
 Shayne Wasden – Assistant Head Coach
 Neal Brown – Offensive Coordinator/Quarterbacks
 Jeremy Rowell – Defensive Coordinator/Secondary
 Randy Butler – Defensive Ends/Recruiting Coordinator
 Maurea Crain – Defensive Line
 Kenny Edenfield – Inside Receivers
 Benjy Parker – Linebackers
 John Schlarman – Offensive Line
 Chad Scott – Running Backs
 Richard Shaughnessy – Strength and Conditioning

References

Troy
Troy Trojans football seasons
Sun Belt Conference football champion seasons
Troy Trojans football